The Screen Award for Best Child Artist is a new award conducted by the Star Screen Awards to recognise a great performance by a child actor in the previous year.

Winners

Notes

See also
 Screen Awards

Screen Awards